Carlos Henrique Casimiro (born 23 February 1992), known as Casemiro, is a Brazilian professional footballer who plays as a defensive midfielder for  club Manchester United and the Brazil national team. He is regarded as one of the best defensive midfielders of his generation. 

Casemiro started his career with São Paulo, where he scored 11 goals in 111 games. He moved to Real Madrid in 2013, and also spent the 2014–15 season on loan at Porto. He won eighteen trophies at Real Madrid, including five UEFA Champions Leagues, three La Liga titles, one Copa del Rey and three FIFA Club World Cups. In 2022, he left Madrid to join Manchester United, winning the EFL Cup in his first season.

A full international since 2011, Casemiro was in Brazil's squad at the 2018 and 2022 FIFA World Cups, as well as four Copa América tournaments, winning the 2019 edition.

Club career

São Paulo

2003–2010: Youth career
Born in São José dos Campos, São Paulo, Casemiro was a product of São Paulo's youth system. From the age of 11 upwards, he acted as captain to its sides; he was known as "Carlão" – an augmentative form of his first name in Portuguese – early on, and would be called up for the 2009 FIFA U-17 World Cup.

2010–2013: Consistent success
Casemiro made his Série A debut on 25 July 2010, in an away loss against Santos. He scored his first goal as a professional on 15 August, helping to a 2–2 draw with Cruzeiro.

On 7 April 2012, Casemiro scored the first goal of a 2–0 win over Mogi Mirim at the Arena Barueri in that year's Campeonato Paulista after replacing the injured Fabrício early on, but was later sent off. São Paulo also won the Copa Sudamericana, with the player making one substitute appearance in a 5–0 home success against Universidad de Chile in the quarter-final second leg on 7 November.

Real Madrid

2013–2015: First successes and loan to Porto
On 31 January 2013, Casemiro was loaned to Real Madrid in Spain, being assigned to the B-team in Segunda División. He played his first game in the competition on 16 February, starting in a 1–3 defeat at Sabadell. Casemiro made his La Liga debut on 20 April, playing the full 90 minutes in a 3–1 home win over Real Betis. On 2 June, he scored his first goal in Europe, opening the reserves' 4–0 win over Alcorcón at the Alfredo Di Stéfano Stadium. Eight days after his first goal for Real Madrid Castilla, the move was made permanent for four years and a fee of R$18.738 million was paid.

Casemiro was loaned to Porto on 19 July 2014 in a season-long loan. He totalled 41 games overall for the Portuguese club, scoring four goals, including a free kick on 10 March 2015 in a 4–0 home win over Basel in the last 16 of the UEFA Champions League.

2015–2016: Becoming first-choice

On 5 June 2015, Casemiro returned to Real Madrid who activated his buyback clause, and two months later his contract was extended until 2021. On 13 March 2016, he scored his first competitive goal for the Merengues, heading home an 89th-minute corner kick by Jesé in a 2–1 victory at Las Palmas. After being mostly a reserve player under Rafael Benítez, Casemiro became first-choice under his successor Zinedine Zidane, and contributed with 11 appearances in that season's Champions League. In the final against Atlético Madrid, he featured the full 120 minutes, as Real Madrid won their 11th title in a penalty shoot-out after a 1–1 draw.

2016–2022: Prolific success
Casemiro scored four goals in 25 matches in the 2016–17 La Liga, helping his team win the league title for the first time in five years. He then scored a long-range strike in the Champions League final against Juventus, helping his team to a 4–1 victory. He again found the net on 8 August, putting his team ahead in a 2–1 victory over Manchester United in the 2017 UEFA Super Cup.

During the 2017–18 Champions League, Casemiro made 12 appearances while scoring one goal, as Madrid won their third consecutive and 13th overall title in the competition.

He was a regular starter during the season, as Real Madrid won the 2019–20 La Liga.

In August 2021, he extended his contract until June 2025. A year later, Casemiro was named Man of the Match, as Real Madrid defeated Eintracht Frankfurt 2–0 for the 2022 Super Cup.

Manchester United
On 19 August 2022, Real Madrid and Manchester United announced that they had reached an agreement for the transfer of Casemiro. Three days later, he signed a four-year contract with the English club, with an option for an additional year's extension. The deal was reportedly worth £60 million, plus £10 million in add-ons. He made his debut for the club when he came on as a substitute in a Premier League win away at Southampton on 27 August. On 22 October, he scored his first Premier League goal from a header in the 94th minute in a 1–1 away draw against Chelsea. On 28 January 2023, he scored a brace for United in a 3–1 win over Reading in the FA Cup.

On 4 February, Casemiro was given a red card for violent conduct during a match against Crystal Palace for putting his hands around the neck of Will Hughes during a confrontation which also saw Antony and Jeffrey Schlupp receive yellow cards. This resulted in a three-match domestic ban; United would go on to win the match 2–1. He won the EFL Cup on 26 February, his first trophy at the club, scoring the opening goal against Newcastle United in the 33rd minute. His performance also earned him the Alan Hardaker Trophy.

Casemiro was sent off again in Manchester United's 0–0 draw against Southampton on 12 March after a tackle on Carlos Alcaraz. Referee Anthony Taylor had initially shown a yellow card but changed his decision following intervention from the video assistant referee (VAR). Casemiro left the pitch in tears; United manager Erik ten Hag felt that the decision was unfair, saying that Casemiro is a "really fair player" and complained about the lack of consistency in the use of VAR. Despite this, the club decided not to appeal the decision, and Casemiro will serve a domestic four-match ban.

International career

Youth teams
Casemiro scored one goal in seven appearances for the Brazil under-17 team. He played for the Brazil under-20 team at the 2011 South American U-20 Championship and the 2011 FIFA U-20 World Cup, scoring three goals in 15 appearances in total at this level.

Senior team

Casemiro made his debut for the Brazil senior team on 14 September 2011, in a 0–0 draw against Argentina, aged 19. He was named by manager Dunga in the Brazilian squad for the 2015 Copa América, but did not play any matches in the quarter-final exit in Chile.

On 5 May 2016, he was named among the 23-man list for the Copa América Centenario to be held in the United States.

In May 2018, Casemiro was selected by manager Tite for the 2018 FIFA World Cup in Russia. He made his debut in the competition on 17 June, playing 60 minutes in a 1–1 group stage draw to Switzerland.

In May 2019, he was included in Brazil's 23-man squad for the 2019 Copa América on home soil. In the final group game at the Arena Corinthians against Peru, he scored his first international goal to open a 5–0 victory, but was also sent off for two yellow cards and suspended from the next match. He started in Brazil's 3–1 victory over Peru in the 2019 Copa América Final on 7 July, at the Maracanã Stadium.

He was named to the 2021 Copa América squad on 9 June 2021. In Brazil's third group match on 23 June, he scored the match–winning goal following a Neymar corner in injury time, to help his team defeat Colombia 2–1. On 10 July, he started in his nation's 1–0 defeat to rivals Argentina in the final.

On 7 November 2022, Casemiro was named in the squad for the 2022 World Cup in Qatar. On 28 November, he scored the winning goal in the second group match against Switzerland. Brazil were eliminated by Croatia in the quarter-finals on 9 December, following a 4–2 penalty shoot-out loss after a 1–1 draw following extra-time, although Casemiro was able to net his spot kick.

Style of play
Casemiro mainly plays as a defensive midfielder, although he has also been deployed in anchor man role in the centre of the pitch, or even as a centre-back on occasion. Casemiro is an intelligent, physically strong, mobile, aggressive, and hard-tackling midfielder, with an extremely high work-rate and good technical ability. While he is mainly known for his ability to provide balance to his teams by supporting his more offensive-minded teammates defensively, and distributing the ball to them accurately after winning back possession, he is also a well-rounded midfielder, who possesses a powerful shot from outside the penalty area, and reliable distribution, as well as an ability to get forward with his runs off the ball, or start attacks with his passing. These characteristics also enable him to contribute offensively, or even score goals, in addition to breaking up plays. Moreover, his quick reactions, as well as his excellent positional sense, ability to read the game, and good anticipation, enable him to excel in a holding midfield role in front of the defence, by cutting out counter-attacks and shielding the back-line.

Often described as a "destroyer" in the media, he has drawn praise from pundits for his energetic and combative style of play, as well as his tactical awareness and abilities as a ball winner, which enable him to cover ground, track back, and press opponents. His tenacity on the pitch, exemplified by his fierce challenges and stamina, have led Marca to nickname him "The Tank." In addition to his footballing abilities, he also stands out for his competitive spirit, mentality, consistency, and determination on the pitch. Despite maintaining a good disciplinary record, he has, however, also come into criticism in the media at times over his excessively aggressive challenges on the pitch. Casemiro's playing style has drawn comparisons with that of former Real Madrid defensive midfielder Claude Makélélé, as well as compatriot Toninho Cerezo.

Career statistics

Club

International

Scores and results list Brazil's goal tally first, score column indicates score after each Casemiro goal

Honours
São Paulo
Copa Sudamericana: 2012

Real Madrid
La Liga: 2016–17, 2019–20, 2021–22
Copa del Rey: 2013–14
Supercopa de España: 2017, 2019–20, 2021–22
UEFA Champions League: 2013–14, 2015–16, 2016–17, 2017–18, 2021–22
UEFA Super Cup: 2016, 2017, 2022
FIFA Club World Cup: 2016, 2017, 2018

Manchester United
EFL Cup: 2022–23

Brazil U17
South American U-17 Championship: 2009

Brazil U20
FIFA U-20 World Cup: 2011
South American U-20 Championship: 2011

Brazil
Copa América: 2019

Individual
UEFA Champions League Squad of the Season: 2016–17, 2017–18
UEFA La Liga Team of the Season: 2019–20
Copa América Team of the Tournament: 2021
Alan Hardaker Trophy: 2023
FIFA FIFPRO Men's World 11: 2022

References

External links

Profile at the Manchester United F.C. website

1992 births
Living people
People from São José dos Campos
Footballers from São Paulo (state)
Brazilian footballers
Association football midfielders
São Paulo FC players
Real Madrid Castilla footballers
Real Madrid CF players
FC Porto players
Manchester United F.C. players
Campeonato Brasileiro Série A players
Segunda División players
La Liga players
Primeira Liga players
Premier League players
UEFA Champions League winning players
Brazil youth international footballers
Brazil under-20 international footballers
Brazil international footballers
2015 Copa América players
Copa América Centenario players
2018 FIFA World Cup players
2019 Copa América players
2021 Copa América players
2022 FIFA World Cup players
Copa América-winning players
Brazilian expatriate footballers
Expatriate footballers in England
Expatriate footballers in Portugal
Expatriate footballers in Spain
Brazilian expatriate sportspeople in England
Brazilian expatriate sportspeople in Portugal
Brazilian expatriate sportspeople in Spain